David Michael Alexander (June 3, 1947 – February 10, 1975) was an American musician, best known as the original bassist for influential protopunk band The Stooges.

Biography
After his family relocated to Ann Arbor, Michigan, from Whitmore Lake, Michigan, Alexander attended Pioneer High School in Ann Arbor, where he met brothers Ron and Scott Asheton. "Zander" (as Alexander was known) dropped out after 45 minutes on the first day of his senior year in 1965 to win a bet. Later in 1965, Ron sold his motorcycle and they went to England to see The Who and to "try and find The Beatles".

Alexander and the Asheton brothers soon met Iggy Pop and formed The Stooges in 1967. Although Alexander was a total novice on his instrument, he was a quick learner and subsequently had a hand in arranging, composing and performing all of the songs that appeared on the band's first two albums, The Stooges and Fun House. He is often credited by Pop and was credited by the late Ron Asheton in interviews with being the primary composer of the music for the Stooges songs "We Will Fall", "Little Doll" (both on The Stooges), "Dirt" and "1970" (both on Fun House).

Alexander was fired from the band in August 1970 after showing up at the Goose Lake International Music Festival too drunk to play. After his dismissal, Alexander was replaced by bassists Zeke Zettner and Jimmy Recca, though Ron Asheton played bass on the first studio album post-Alexander, Raw Power. Alexander remained close friends with both Asheton brothers, as well as with Bill Cheatham, who was a roadie and high school friend of both Alexander and the Asheton brothers. Alexander did not join another band after his dismissal from The Stooges, instead mainly relying on money made from investments made in the stock market to make ends meet.

Death
Alexander died of pulmonary edema in 1975, at the age of 27 in Ann Arbor, after being admitted to a hospital for pancreatitis, which was linked to his alcoholism.

References in songs
Mike Watt mentions Alexander by name in his song "The Angel's Gate," on his 2004 album The Secondman's Middle Stand, by which time Watt had replaced Alexander in the reformed Stooges. At Watt's first performance with the Stooges at the Coachella Valley Music and Arts Festival in May 2003, he wore a Dave Alexander t-shirt as a tribute.

Iggy Pop references Alexander in the spoken intro to "Dum Dum Boys" on his 1977 album The Idiot:

See also
27 Club

References

External links
The Lost Stooge: Chasing the Ghost of Dave Alexander
 Dave Alexander on Open Up and Bleed site

1947 births
1975 deaths
American punk rock bass guitarists
American male bass guitarists
Musicians from Ann Arbor, Michigan
The Stooges members
Protopunk musicians
Guitarists from Michigan
American male guitarists
20th-century American bass guitarists
20th-century American male musicians
Deaths from pulmonary edema
Alcohol-related deaths in Michigan